Ernst Waldschmidt (July 15, 1897, Lünen, Province of Westphalia – February 25, 1985, Göttingen) was a German orientalist and Indologist. He was a pupil of German indologist Emil Sieg.
 
He taught at Berlin University and began teaching at the University of Göttingen in 1936. Waldschmidt joined the Nazi party in May 1937 and became a member of the National Socialist German Lecturers League in 1939.<ref>Anikó Szabó: Vertreibung, Rückkehr, Wiedergutmachung - Göttinger Hochschullehrer im Schatten des Nationalsozialismus, 2000</ref>

He was a specialist on Indian philosophy, and archaeology of India and Central Asia.
He also founded Stiftung Ernst Waldschmidt.

 Literary works 
 Buddhistische Kunst in Indien, 1932
 Die buddhistische Spätantike in Mittelasien (the 7th Volume), 1933
 Gandhara, Kutscha, Turfan, 1925
 Die Überlieferung vom Lebensende des Buddha'', 2 Vols., 1944-1948

References

Bibliography

External links
 http://titus.uni-frankfurt.de/personal/galeria/waldschm.htm (pictures)
 https://archive.today/20120906182336/http://www.indologie.uni-goettingen.de/cms/index.php?id=13 

1897 births
1985 deaths
People from Lünen
German orientalists
Nazi Party politicians
People from the Province of Westphalia
History of Buddhism
German Indologists
Indologists
Archaeologists from North Rhine-Westphalia
German male non-fiction writers
Members of the German Academy of Sciences at Berlin